HMS Comus was an 18-gun sloop, the name ship of her class, built for the Royal Navy during the 1820s.

Description
The ship's tonnage was 462  tons burthen. The Comet class was armed with a pair of 9-pounder cannon in the bow and sixteen 32-pounder carronades. The ships had a crew of 125 officers and ratings.

Construction and career
Comus, the second ship of her name to serve in the Royal Navy, was ordered with the name of Comet on 15 May 1821, laid down in October 1826 at Pembroke Dockyard, Wales, and launched on 14 August 1828. She was completed on 28 February 1829 at Plymouth Dockyard and commissioned on November 1828. The ship was renamed Comus on 31 October 1832.

On 17 November 1833, Comus ran aground on the North Bank in Liverpool Bay during a voyage from Liverpool, Lancashire, England, to Dublin, Ireland.

On 25 September 1847, Comus was driven ashore and sank near Montevideo, Uruguay. Subsequently refloated, she was repaired and returned to service.

Comus was broken up on 10 May 1862.

Notes

References

External links 
 Naval database: Comus, 1832 

 

Comet-class sloop
1828 ships
Ships built in Pembroke Dock
Maritime incidents in November 1833
Maritime incidents in September 1847